Miltonia russelliana, the Russell's miltonia, is a species of orchid occurring in southeastern and southern Brazil.

References

External links 

russelliana
Endemic orchids of Brazil
Flora of the Atlantic Forest